Paraneoplastic keratoderma is a cutaneous condition characterized by a hornlike skin texture associated with an internal malignancy.

See also 
 Keratoderma
 List of cutaneous conditions

References 

Dermatologic terminology

Papulosquamous hyperkeratotic cutaneous conditions